Wilbert Otto "Barney" Wolfe (June 10, 1876 – February 27, 1953) was a  professional baseball pitcher. He played four seasons in Major League Baseball for the New York Highlanders and the Washington Senators from 1903 to 1906. In 76 career games, he had 21 wins and 37 losses, with a 2.96 ERA. He batted and threw right-handed.

Wolfe was born in Independence, Pennsylvania, and died in North Charleroi, Pennsylvania.

External links

Major League Baseball pitchers
New York Highlanders players
Washington Senators (1901–1960) players
Kansas City Blues (baseball) players
Charleroi (minor league baseball) players
Louisville Colonels (minor league) players
East Liverpool Potters (baseball) players
Clarksburg Bees players
Wheeling Stogies players
Baseball players from Pennsylvania
1876 births
1953 deaths